Mohamed Barguaoui (born 5 January 1975) is a Tunisian wrestler. He competed in the men's Greco-Roman 58 kg at the 2000 Summer Olympics.

References

1975 births
Living people
Tunisian male sport wrestlers
Olympic wrestlers of Tunisia
Wrestlers at the 2000 Summer Olympics
Place of birth missing (living people)